Vespula is a small genus of social wasps, widely distributed in the Northern Hemisphere. Along with members of their sister genus Dolichovespula, they are collectively known by the common name yellowjackets (or yellow jackets) in North America. Vespula species have a shorter oculomalar space (shown in the figure below right) and a more pronounced tendency to nest underground than Dolichovespula.

Notable species
 While most species of this genus inhabit North America, four Vespula species inhabit Europe, namely V. austriaca, V. germanica, V. rufa and V. vulgaris.
 Two common European species, the German wasp (Vespula germanica) and the common wasp (Vespula vulgaris), have established in other countries: both species are now found in New Zealand, Australia and South America, while the former has also been introduced in North America, and the latter in southern Africa.
 The eastern yellowjacket (Vespula maculifrons) and western yellowjacket (Vespula pensylvanica) are native to North America.

Species

 Vespula acadica (Sladen, 1918) – forest yellowjacket
 Vespula alascensis Packard, 1870 – common yellowjacket
 Vespula arisana (Sonan, 1929)
 Vespula atropilosa (Sladen, 1918) – prairie yellowjacket
 Vespula austriaca (Panzer, 1799) – red cuckoo wasp
 Vespula consobrina (Saussure, 1854) – blackjacket
 Vespula flaviceps (Smith, 1870)
 Vespula flavopilosa Jacobson, 1978 – downy yellowjacket
 Vespula germanica (Fabricius, 1793) – German wasp, German yellowjacket
 Vespula inexspectata Eck, 1991
 Vespula infernalis (Saussure, 1854) – cuckoo yellowjacket
 Vespula ingrica Birula, 1931
 Vespula intermedia (Buysson, 1904–05) – northern red-banded yellowjacket
 Vespula kingdonwardi Archer, 1981
 Vespula koreensis (Rad., 1887)
 Vespula maculifrons (Buysson, 1905) – eastern yellowjacket
 Vespula nursei (Archer, 1981)
 Vespula orbata (Buysson 1902)
 Vespula orientalis (Linnaeus, 1771) - oriental hornet
 Vespula pensylvanica (Saussure, 1857) – western yellowjacket
 Vespula rufa (Linnaeus, 1758) – red wasp
 Vespula rufosignata (Eck, 1998)
 Vespula shidai (Ish., Yam., Wagn., 1980)
 Vespula squamosa (Drury, 1770) – southern yellowjacket
 Vespula structor (Smith, 1870)
 Vespula sulphurea (Saussure, 1854) – California yellowjacket
 Vespula vidua (Saussure, 1854)
 Vespula vulgaris (Linnaeus, 1758) – common wasp

See also:
Paravespula, a subgenus of Vespula

Venom
The venom of Vespula is mostly composed of antigen 5, hyaluronidase, and phospholipase.

Immunology
There is a high degree of similarity between immunogenic fractions of different Vespulae. Rabbit serum is unable to distinguish between them.

References

 

Vespidae
Taxa named by Carl Gustaf Thomson

pl:Osa